Red Valley is an unincorporated community located within Upper Freehold Township in Monmouth County, New Jersey, United States. The settlement is located at the intersection of County Route 526 and Red Valley Road (south) and Yellow Meetinghouse Road (north) near the township's eastern border with Millstone Township. Except for some single-family houses located along the roads in the area, the area is primarily made up of farmland (both agricultural and horse farms).

The Yellow Meeting House Cemetery is located in Red Valley, with several early settlers interred there.

References

External links
 

Upper Freehold Township, New Jersey
Unincorporated communities in Monmouth County, New Jersey
Unincorporated communities in New Jersey